Marc Andre Schuh (born 12 August 1989 in Bergisch Gladbach) is a German wheelchair sprinter.

Life 
Marc Schuh was born with a spine malformation which keeps him from walking. He finished gymnasium with Abitur in 2007 at the Otto-Hahn-Gymnasium in Bensberg as best of the year in chemistry and physics. In the same year he started his studies at the University of Heidelberg majoring physics. In 2012 he finished his bachelor's degree  and started his master, which he finished in 2014; his master thesis is about Simulations of the electrostatic and magnetic field properties and tests of the Penning-ion source at THe-Trap. In November 2014 he became a Ph.D. student at the Max-Planck-Institut für Kernphysik in the group Klaus Blaum at The-Trap experiment. The goal of the experiment was to improve the Q-value of Tritium by using Penning-traps. He finished his PhD in May 2019 with the thesis titled "Simulations of the image charge effect in high-precision Penningtraps and the new IGISOL ionbuncher". Currently he is working as an IT consultant in Munich.

Successes 
After trying wheelchair basketball and wheelchair tennis, he took part at his first athletics competition the Mobifanten-Cup as part of the competition Heidelberg-Marathon at the age of 10, which he won directly.

2005 he became second at his first junior U18 world championships Stoke Mandeville (United Kingdom) in the 100 m and 200 m. At the 2008 Summer Paralympics in Beijing he reached the semi final in the 400 m. In the same year he became junior world champion in United States in the 100 m, 200 m und 400 m in the category U20.

In 2009 he won gold at the junior world championship in Nottwil in the 100 m, 200 m, 400 m and 4x100 m relay, this time in the category U23. Additionally since 2009 Marc Schuh owns the German national records in the 100 m, 200 m and 400 m. In November 2009 he took part at the IWAS-World championship in Bangalore and became world champion in the 400 m. Since 2010 he owns the European record in the 400 m with a time of 45,64 s. 2015 he improved this record down to 45,40 s and raced again the second fastest time in history. He is the first and only athlete that could stay under 46 s more than once. In total he stayed three times under 46 s. At the 2012 Summer Paralympics in London Schuh became fifth on the 100 m and sixth on the 400 m. At the world championships 2013 in Lyon he won silver in the 400 m and bronze in the 100 m. 2014 he started at the IPC-European Championship in Swansea in the 100 m, 200 m, 400 m and 800 m. On all four distances he finished on the podium. His best result is a silver medal in the 400 m.

References

Literature

External links 

 
 
 

1989 births
Living people
German male wheelchair racers
Paralympic athletes of Germany
Athletes (track and field) at the 2008 Summer Paralympics
Athletes (track and field) at the 2012 Summer Paralympics
Medalists at the World Para Athletics Championships
Medalists at the World Para Athletics European Championships
People from Bergisch Gladbach
Sportspeople from Cologne (region)